Nance County is a county in the U.S. state of Nebraska. As of the 2010 census, the population was 3,735. Its county seat is Fullerton.

In the Nebraska license plate system, Nance County is represented by the prefix 58 (it had the fifty-eighth-largest number of vehicles registered in the county when the license plate system was established in 1922).

History
The land that comprises Nance County was originally part of the Pawnee Reservation, created in 1857 when the Pawnee Indians signed a treaty with the United States ceding its lands in exchange for the reservation. After Nebraska gained statehood in March 1867, the state government extinguished the tribe's rights to their land,  sold the land and used the proceeds to defray expenses to obtain lands elsewhere for the Indians. In the mid-1870s the remainder of the reservation was sold, and in 1876 the tribe was relocated to its present-day location in central Oklahoma. The boundaries for Nance County were approved in 1879. It was named for Governor Albinus Nance.

Nearly all the land in Nance County was purchased by settlers or by investors for resale, instead of the homestead provisions common to most of Nebraska.

Geography
The terrain of Nance County consists of rolling hills, sloping to the northeast. The Loup River flows east-northeastward through the central part of the county. The Cedar River flows southeastward to discharge into the Loup River near Fullerton.

Major highways

  Nebraska Highway 14
  Nebraska Highway 22
  Nebraska Highway 39
  Nebraska Highway 52

Adjacent counties

 Platte County (northeast)
 Merrick County (south)
 Greeley County (west)
 Boone County (north)

Demographics

As of the 2000 United States Census there were 4,038 people, 1,577 households, and 1,107 families in the county. The population density was 9 people per square mile (4/km2). There were 1,787 housing units at an average density of 4 per square mile (2/km2). The racial makeup of the county was 98.39% White, 0.37% Native American, 0.05% Asian, 0.45% from other races, and 0.74% from two or more races. 1.14% of the population were Hispanic or Latino of any race.

There were 1,577 households, out of which 32.80% had children under the age of 18 living with them, 60.50% were married couples living together, 5.60% had a female householder with no husband present, and 29.80% were non-families. 27.60% of all households were made up of individuals, and 13.80% had someone living alone who was 65 years of age or older. The average household size was 2.49 and the average family size was 3.05.

The county population contained 27.90% under the age of 18, 6.80% from 18 to 24, 23.60% from 25 to 44, 22.00% from 45 to 64, and 19.70% who were 65 years of age or older. The median age was 40 years. For every 100 females there were 104.20 males. For every 100 females age 18 and over, there were 101.90 males.

The median income for a household in the county was $31,267, and the median income for a family was $38,717. Males had a median income of $25,349 versus $19,044 for females. The per capita income for the county was $16,886. About 10.20% of families and 13.10% of the population were below the poverty line, including 17.20% of those under age 18 and 9.30% of those age 65 or over.

Communities

Cities
 Fullerton (county seat)
 Genoa

Village
 Belgrade

Unincorporated communities
 Krakow
 Merchiston

Townships

 Beaver
 Cedar
 Cottonwood
 Council Creek
 East Newman
 Fullerton
 Genoa
 Loup Ferry
 Prairie Creek
 South Branch
 Timber Creek
 West Newman

Politics
Nance County voters are reliably Republican. In only one national election since 1936 has the county selected the Democratic Party candidate.

See also
 National Register of Historic Places listings in Nance County, Nebraska

References

 
Nebraska counties
1879 establishments in Nebraska
Populated places established in 1879